George Watson Milles, 1st Earl Sondes (2 October 1824 – 10 September 1894), was a British peer and Conservative politician. Sondes was the son of George Milles, 4th Baron Sondes by his wife Eleanor Knatchbull, 5th daughter of Sir Edward Knatchbull, 8th Baronet.

Political career
Sondes was elected Member of Parliament for Kent East in 1868, a seat he held until 1874 when he succeeded his father as fifth Baron Sondes and entered the House of Lords. In 1880 he was created Viscount Throwley, of the County of Kent, and Earl Sondes, of Lees Court in the County of Kent.

Cricket
A keen amateur cricketer, Milles made a single appearance in first-class cricket for the Gentlemen of Kent against the Gentlemen of England at Lord's in 1849. Batting twice in the match, he was dismissed for 3 runs in the Gentlemen of Kent first innings by Thomas Craven, while in their second innings he was dismissed without scoring by the same bowler.

Family
Lord Sondes married Charlotte Stracey, daughter of Sir Henry Stracey, 5th Baronet, in 1859. They had several children. Mary Georgina was born in 1859 and died in 1908. Lily Geraldine was born in 1862 and died in 1914.  He died in September 1894, aged 69, and was succeeded in his titles by his eldest son, George Milles-Lade, 2nd Earl Sondes. Lady Sondes died in June 1927.

Arms

References
Kidd, Charles, Williamson, David (editors). Debrett's Peerage and Baronetage (1990 edition). New York: St Martin's Press, 1990,

External links 
 

1824 births
1894 deaths
People educated at Eton College
Conservative Party (UK) MPs for English constituencies
UK MPs 1868–1874
UK MPs 1874–1880
UK MPs who inherited peerages
UK MPs who were granted peerages
People from the Borough of Swale
George 1
Milles-Lade family
English cricketers
Gentlemen of Kent cricketers
Peers of the United Kingdom created by Queen Victoria